One Queensbridge (or Crown Queensbridge) was a proposed mixed–used supertall skyscraper to be located in the Southbank precinct of Melbourne, Australia. The skyscraper would have become the tallest building in Melbourne, surpassing the height of Australia 108, and the tallest building in Australia, eclipsing the height of Q1. In addition to being the tallest, the development would have been one of the biggest single–building projects in Australia, encompassing  of floor area.

Proposed by Crown Limited and the Schiavello Group, the $1.75 billion skyscraper would have reached  in height, and comprised a six–star hotel of 388 rooms, in conjunction with 708 residential apartments, over 90 levels. Additionally, a footbridge was to link the project to the Crown Casino and Entertainment Complex, across Queensbridge Street. Construction was originally expected to commence in 2018, and was estimated to be completed in five to six years. However, due to slowing residential apartment market conditions and an inability to obtain financing for the project, construction was unable to commence prior to expiration of the project's planning permit.

Site 
One Queensbridge was to be built on the amalgamated site 1–29 Queensbridge Street, in the Southbank precinct of Melbourne. Directly across from the Queensbridge site, is Crown Melbourne.

The subject site is currently occupied by four buildings, of commercial use and each between three and six levels in height, at the addresses of 1–7, 9–15, 17–23, and 25–29 Queensbridge Street. Prior to the acquisition of the sites, 25-29 Queensbridge Street was subject to plans for a 71–storey residential building, proposed in 2012. Despite its approval in August 2012, the skyscraper did not proceed to construction.

From 1899 to 1914, 1–7 Queensbridge Street was occupied by the Fall's Bridge Hotel, and at the time, it had a Moray Street address (which would later be renamed Queensbridge Street). In 1914, the hotel was renamed to the Queen's Bridge Hotel; however, it was considered a deathtrap, and in 1926 a new building was erected for A£17,000. A $12 million redevelopment of the Hotel saw it converted into a nightclub in October 1999, and it was renamed to QBH. Over the next decade, the nightclub maintained popularity but also notoriety, having been the scene of violence and brawls; this resulted in the club's patron limit cut down from 2,200, to 1,500. By the late 2000s, the QBH was closed–down, and the site was placed on the market. The Schiavello Group purchased the site in 2010, and has used the former hotel as a Schiavello Furniture showroom.

Development history 
Having purchased the 1 Queensbridge site in 2010, the Schiavello Group in conjunction with Bates Smart architectural firm, proposed a residential skyscraper on the site in 2011. The $275 million development, designed by Bates Smart, would comprise 592 residential apartments and 566 car parking spaces.

However, by July 2014, a deal was brokered between Schiavello Group and by Crown Limited (owner of the nearby Crown Casino and Entertainment Complex) that would see both companies participate in a joint development. Plans were later resubmitted to the State Government as to accommodate 626 apartments, a 400–room five–star hotel, a sky lounge, as well as a footbridge across Queensbridge Street joining the development to Crown casino. The development would have been named the "Queensbridge Tower".

Approved design 
The number of residential apartments was boosted to 708, whilst the number of 6–star hotel rooms remained at 388, and the footbridge across Queensbridge Street joining the development to Crown casino was preserved in the plans. Additionally, access to the 90th–level would have been open to the public, which was to include function space, bars, and gardens. London–based architectural firm WilkinsonEyre joined the project, after their design of One Queensbridge was chosen at an international design competition for the development in 2015. WilkinsonEyre previously collaborated with Crown Limited, having designed the Crown Sydney skyscraper currently under construction in Barangaroo, Sydney.

The development —now referred to as "One Queensbridge"— required approval for construction by the State Government; approval it received by the Planning Minister, Richard Wynne, in February 2017.

A condition of the skyscraper's approval stipulated that $100 million of the developers' would be allocated towards a community benefits package, which would see upgrades to Queensbridge Square and the Sandridge Bridge. The Square would have seen landscaping and two new cafes, where as the former railway bridge would have undergone a $15 million redevelopment, that would have turned it into the likes of the High Line park, in Manhattan, New York. Furthermore, Southbank Boulevard would have benefited from the package, with improvements including a new bike strip.

The project eclipsed one of the Government's planning restrictions introduced in 2015, that limits skyscrapers from exceeding a floor area plot ratio of 24:1 (that is, buildings cannot exceed 24 times the block of land it is built on), and is more than three times the Government's 2016 proposal of 18:1 plot ratio. According to Crown Limited, the $1.75 billion project would have created an estimated 1,200 direct and 1,680 indirect construction jobs over five years, as well as 1,050 permanent jobs following its completion. The skyscraper could have taken up to five to six years to build, with an expected commencement of construction in 2018.

However, due to a dramatically slowing residential apartment market, as well as an inability to secure financing for the massive project, construction on the tower was unable to commence prior to the expiration of its planning permit, with the site's use and future now unknown. In the absence of renewal of the project's permit, it is likely a revised or redesigned project will be put forward by the developers at a later period.

Upon completion, the skyscraper would have become the tallest building in Melbourne, surpassing the height of Australia 108, a supertall skyscraper which stands  in height. Additionally, One Queensbridge would have become the tallest building in Australia, surpassing the Gold Coast's Q1, which stands  in height to its spire.

See also 
 List of tallest buildings in Melbourne

References

External links 

One Queensbridge — on CTBUH Skyscraper Center

Skyscrapers in Melbourne
Residential skyscrapers in Australia
Apartment buildings in Melbourne
Proposed skyscrapers in Australia
Skyscraper hotels in Australia
Southbank, Victoria